Patrick or Paddy Agnew may refer to:
 Sir Patrick Agnew, 1st Baronet (c. 1578–1661), Member of Parliament for Wigtownshire, 1628–1633 and 1643–1647
 Paddy Agnew (Stormont MP) (1878–fl. 1958), Northern Ireland Labour Party MP for South Armagh 1938–1945
 Paddy Agnew (Irish republican) (born 1955), former IRA volunteer  elected to Dáil Éireann during the 1981 Irish Hunger Strike
 Patrick Alexander Agnew (1765–1813), governor of British Ceylon, 1795–1796
 Patrick Alexander Vans Agnew (1822–1848), British civil servant of the East India Company